Anne Girouard (born 18 March 1976 La Garenne-Colombes) is a French comedian.

Life 
She passed a literary baccalaureate, then a degree in philosophy. She studied theater at the Conservatoire de Versailles, at the École Supérieure d'Art Dramatique, and at the École Nationale Supérieure des Arts et Techniques du Théâtre (ENSATT).

She began by acting in theater in Les Deux Timides or L'éveil du Printemps. She appeared regularly with director Anne-Laure Liégeois (Macbeth by William Shakespeare, Edouard II by Christopher Marlowe, Dom Juan by Molière, The Duchess of Malfi by John Webster, L'Augmentation by Georges Perec, Débrayage by Rémi De Vos, The Jacques Toy market. She also worked with Brigitte Jaques-Wajemann and Nathalie Grauwin, Pierre Bénézit, Paul Golub, Philippe Faure, Vincent Debost and Arlette Téphany.

In the cinema, she  appeared in Démon de Midi in 2005,  in L'Auberge rouge in 2007, and in  Enfin veuve in 2008.

On television, she played Queen Guenièvre in Alexandre Astier's Kaamelott series from 2004 to 2009. She played in the soap opera The Poisoner. She made appearances in other popular films and series, such as Alex Hugo and Candice Renoir.

In 2021, she resumed the role of Queen Guinevere in the film Kaamelott: Premier Volet by Alexandre Astier.

Family 
She is married and has two children.

References 

Living people
1976 births
French comedians
French actors